The Philadelphia Rockets were a minor professional ice hockey team based in the Philadelphia Arena in Philadelphia, Pennsylvania. The Rockets played for three seasons in American Hockey League from 1946 to 1949. Previously another Rockets team existed for the 1941–42 AHL season, formerly known as the Philadelphia Ramblers.

When the original Rockets folded in 1942, they were replaced by the Philadelphia Falcons of the Eastern Hockey League. In 1946, the Falcons were replaced by the second Rockets team in the AHL. Four members of the Falcons (Vic Lofvendahl, Harvey Jacklin, Clayton Lavell, George DeFilice), made the jump to the higher league.

Season-by-season results
 Philadelphia Falcons 1942–1946 (Eastern Hockey League)
 Philadelphia Rockets 1946–1949 (American Hockey League)

External links
"A Brief History of The American Hockey League & Minor League Pro Hockey in Philadelphia: 1927 - 2005"

 
Defunct sports teams in Philadelphia
Eastern Hockey League teams